{{DISPLAYTITLE:C4H5N3O}}
The molecular formula C4H5N3O (molar mass: 111.10 g/mol, exact mass: 111.0433 u) may refer to:

 Cytosine (Cyt)
 Imexon
 Isocytosine, or 2-aminouracil

Molecular formulas